The 2021–22 Drake Bulldogs men's basketball team represented Drake University during the 2021–22 NCAA Division I men's basketball season. The Bulldogs were led by fourth-year head coach Darian DeVries. They played their home games at the Knapp Center in Des Moines, Iowa as members of the Missouri Valley Conference (MVC). They finished the regular season 22–9, 13–5 in MVC play to finish in a tie for second place. As the No. 3 seed in the MVC tournament, they defeated Southern Illinois in the quarterfinals and Missouri State in the semifinals before losing to Loyola in the championship.

The Bulldogs accepted an invitation to the College Basketball Invitational and earned the No. 1 overall seed. They defeated Purdue Fort Wayne in the first round before being upset by UNC Wilmington in the quarterfinals.

Previous season
In a season limited due to the ongoing COVID-19 pandemic, the Bulldogs finished the 2020–21 season 26–5, 15–3 in MVC play to finish in second place. The team set a school record by winning their first 18 games, representing the fourth-best start by an MVC school and equaling the sixth-longest winning streak in MVC history. They also earned a ranking in the AP Poll for the first time since 2008 at No. 25 prior to suffering their first loss of the season to Valparaiso on February 7, 2021. 

In the MVC tournament, the Bulldogs advanced to the semifinals via forfeit due to COVID-19 issues at Northern Iowa. They defeated Missouri State in the semifinals before falling to Loyola in the championship game. Drake received an at-large bid to the NCAA tournament as a No. 11 seed in the West region. They defeated Wichita State in the First Four, which was Drake's first tournament win in 50 years. They then lost to USC in the first round. 

Prior to the NCAA tournament, DeVries signed an eight-year contract extension through the 2028–29 season.

Offseason

Departures

Incoming transfers

2021 recruiting class

Roster

Schedule and results

|-
!colspan=9 style=| Exhibition

|-
!colspan=9 style=| Regular season
|-

|-
!colspan=12 style=| MVC tournament

|-
!colspan=12 style=| CBI

Source

Rankings

^Coaches did not release a Week 1 poll.

References

Drake Bulldogs men's basketball seasons
Drake
Drake
Drake
Drake